Rat variety may refer to:

 Fancy rat varieties of R. norvegicus domestica kept as pets
 Stocks and strains of laboratory rats used in science
 Species of rat in a number of families of rodents
 Pet rat species domesticated by humans

See also
 Rat (disambiguation)
 Mouse variety (disambiguation)